Airds of Kells is a farm and small estate  in the historical county of Kirkcudbrightshire in the parish of Kells, Dumfries and Galloway, Scotland. The Category B listed farmhouse dates from the late 18th century but possibly incorporates parts of an older building. The estate was associated with the Gordons of Lochinvar from the 15th century.

Airds of Kells Wood is a biological Site of Special Scientific Interest, notified in 1983. It has the largest remaining block of oak woodland in the Water of Ken/River Dee valley.

See also
List of places in Dumfries and Galloway

References

External links
Scottish Natural Heritage on Airds of Kells Wood

Villages in Dumfries and Galloway